Nogent-sur-Marne is a commune in the eastern suburbs of Paris, France. Nogent-sur-Marne is a sous-préfecture of the Val-de-Marne département, being the seat of the Arrondissement of Nogent-sur-Marne.

History
Several origins of the name have been proposed:

 Novigentum, "new people", i.e. prisoners brought by the Roman armies.
 Nov. indicates fatty or soaked grounds.
 Novientum which is the Gallic equivalent of medieval French "Villeneuve" or English "Newtown".

In the Middle Ages, several castles were built. Le Château de Plaisance, built in the 13th century, which hosted Charles V and Jeanne de Bourbon in 1375. The only vestige which remains is a house of the current private hospital, 30 rue de Plaisance, as well as the bottom of the enclosing wall of the gardens. Le Château de Beauté-sur-Marne, 14th century, is a royal stay. Cardinal de Richelieu destroyed it in 1626.

In the 17th century, whereas the rural population was made up of a majority of vine growers, the middle-class discovered the charms of the country, and settled in Nogent. Jean-Antoine Watteau lived in Mr. Lefevre's house his last moments and died there in 1721.

The construction of the two railway lines: Paris–Mulhouse and Bastille–La Varenne in the 1850s still accelerated the process. The viaduct, built by Auvergnats and Belgians was destroyed once on 15 September 1870. Italians rebuilt it; an Italian community was established there. Coming, for the majority, from the province of Piacenza, they were from the Valley of Nure or from the south of Tyrol.

Isolated since 1854 by the construction of a viaduct for the Paris–Mulhouse line, the commune of Le Perreux sur Marne is born after a fight of more than 10 years in 1887. On 28 February 1887, more than half of the territory of Nogent-sur-Marne was detached and became the commune of Le Perreux-sur-Marne.

In 1929, the commune of Nogent-sur-Marne lost a small part of its territory when the city of Paris annexed the Bois de Vincennes, the eastern fringe of which belonged to Nogent-sur-Marne.

Population

International relations

Nogent-sur-Marne is twinned with:

 Bolesławiec, Poland
 Nazaré, Portugal
 Siegburg, Germany
 Val Nure, Italy
 Yverdon-les-Bains, Switzerland

The commune also has agreements of friendship and co-operation with:

 Figueira da Foz, Portugal
 Jezzine, Lebanon
 Kyzylorda, Kazakhstan
 Metula, Israël
 Nouvion-le-Vineux, France

Transport
 Subway (RER):
Nogent-sur-Marne station on Paris RER line 
Nogent – Le Perreux station on Paris RER line 
 Buses:
116 (Rosny-sous-Bois - RER Val-de-Fontenay - Champigny - Saint-Maur RER)
114 (Gare du Raincy-Villemonble - Château de Vincennes)
113 (Nogent - Chelles)
120 (Nogent - Noisy-le-Grand Mont d'Est ou Mairie)
210 (Château de Vincennes - Gare de Villiers)
317 (Nogent Gare SNCF - Créteil Hôtel de Ville),
 N35 (Night Bus) (Gare de Lyon (75) ↔ Nogent-le-Perreux RER).
  Autoroutes:
 (Paris Super-Périphérique)
both at  03 -  A4–A86 Junction, Nogent-sur-Marne
 
 by boat, by Marne, from Paris.

Education
The commune has the following public preschools and primary schools:
 Preschools: Fontenay, Gallieni, Val de Beauté, Paul Bert, and Guy Môquet
 Elementary schools: Paul Bert, Guy Môquet, Val de Beauté
 School groups (combined preschool and elementary school): Léonard de Vinci and Victor Hugo

The commune has two public junior high schools, Collège Watteau and Collège Branly. Collège Pierre Brossolette is in nearby Le Perreux. The commune has two public academic high schools/sixth-form colleges,  and Lycée Louis Armand, as well as two vocational high schools, La Source and Val de Beauté.

Private schools:

Bibliothèque Cavanna serves as the municipal library.

Notable people

Famous people born in Nogent-sur-Marne

 Kareen Antonn, singer
 Emile Armet de Lisle, industrialist and chemist
 Jacques de Sieyes, WWI hero, activist
 Noura Ben Slama, handball player
 Mamadi Berthe, footballer
 Cindy Billaud, athlete
 François Cavanna, author and satirical newspaper editor
 Émilie Deleuze, film director
 Auguste Dussourd, squash player
 Coralie Demay, racing cyclist
 Thierry Escaich, organist and composer
 Stéphane Galifi, squash player
 Patrice Gerges, Paralympic athlete
 Jean Giraud, comics artist
 Mélissa Gomes, footballer
 Johanne Gomis, basketball player
 Magaye Gueye, footballer
 Jean-Jacques Guissart, rower
 Cloé Hache, swimmer
 Loic Korval, judoka
 Stephane Lambese, footballer
 Henri Lebègue, palaeographer
 Stéphane Lecat, long-distance swimmer
 Romain Le Gac, ice dancer
 Philippe Louviot, cyclist
 Louis Massignon, academic and scholar of Islamic studies
 Bertrand de Montaudoüin, athlete and soldier
 Maria Murano, opera singer
 Lilian Nalis, footballer
 Pierre Oster, poet
 Jeff Panacloc, ventriloquist
 Pierre Papadiamandis, pianist and songwriter
 Michel-Marie Poulain, painter
 Cécile Rigaux, beach volleyball player
 Jacques Sablon, actor
 Jean Sablon, singer and actor
 Baïssama Sankoh, footballer
 Franck Signorino, footballer 
 Amadou Soukouna, footballer
 Félix Trombe, engineer and physicist
 Christian Vander, musician
 Maxime Vachier-Lagrave, chess grandmaster
 Marc Vignal, musicologist
 Nicolas Taravel, footballer

Lived in or associated with Nogent-sur-Marne

 André Bazin, film critic and theorist
 Jules Benoit-Lévy, painter and engraver
 Bérurier Noir, punk rock band
 Maurice Boitel, painter
 Mathieu Boogaerts, singer and songwriter
 Benjamin Castaldi, television host
 Arlette Chabot, journalist
 Zhang Chongren, sculptor and friend of Hergé
 Paul Colin, graphic artist and illustrator
 Ciryl Gane, mixed martial artist
 Marcel Gimond, sculptor
 Yvette Horner, accordionist and pianist
 Daniel du Janerand, painter
 Maxime Lalanne, painter
 Alexandre Langlois, indologist
 Clément Michu, actor 
 Tony Muréna, accordionist and composer
 Pierre Pincemaille, organist
 Lazare Ponticelli, veteran of the First World War 
 Jules Rossi, cyclist
 Michel Rousseau, swimmer
 Charles Trenet, singer and songwriter
 Jean-Baptiste Philibert Vaillant, military commander
 Laurent Voulzy, singer and songwriter
 Antoine Watteau, painter

See also
Communes of the Val-de-Marne department
Les Halles

References

External links

 Nogent-sur-Marne official website
 Nogent-sur-Marne local community website
 Association du Coteau de Nogent sur Marne Nogent-sur-Marne's association for the protection of the environment

Communes of Val-de-Marne
Subprefectures in France